The Price of Peace is a Singaporean television drama set in Japanese-occupied Singapore during World War II. It starred Rayson Tan, Xiang Yun, Chen Shucheng, Jacintha Abisheganaden, James Lye, Lina Ng, Christopher Lee, Ivy Lee, Carole Lin and Ryan Choo. It was first aired on TCS Eighth Frequency (now MediaCorp Channel 8) on 30 June 1997. Although the drama was originally in Mandarin, an English-dubbed version was also broadcast on TCS Fifth Frequency (now MediaCorp Channel 5) in 1999. The drama has been rerun on MediaCorp Channel 8 several times since its premiere and its last airing was in August 2013. It will air again on Sun-Mon from 2 Aug 2021 to 26 Sept 2021 at 4am - 6am.  The series is based on a 1995 book of the same title (published by Asiapac Books), which contains numerous first-hand accounts of war veterans and eyewitnesses. Starting 1 August 2020, it was made available for streaming on Netflix along with over 100 Singapore-made films and series. The whole series is also currently viewable via Mediacorp's official streaming website meWATCH.

Plot

Outline
The plot is divided into seven parts, each focusing on distinct themes and events.

Synopsis
On 7 July 1937, the Marco Polo Bridge Incident sparks off the Second Sino-Japanese War as Japan launches a full invasion on China. Dida Cheng, a deserter from the Chinese army, flees to Malaya, where he meets Cuicui, a Chinese opera actress, and Hideko, a Japanese woman. The three of them are drawn into a complex love triangle. Xie Guomin, an anti-Japanese activist, and Zhou Wenlong, the asthmatic son of a tailor, both fall in love with the porridge vendor Wang Qiumei. After Wang is publicly humiliated by an evil businessman, she is saved by Zhou and decides to marry him. However, she is already secretly pregnant with Xie's child. Their relationships become very strained.

After the Japanese occupied Singapore in 1942, the Sook Ching Massacre takes place when thousands of Chinese deemed to be anti-Japanese activists are rounded up and executed. Following his arrest by the Kempeitai, Xie Guomin becomes a hanjian and informer after succumbing to the enemy under torture. On the other hand, Dida Cheng becomes a resistance fighter and an ally of Force 136, and he continues to fight the Japanese invaders to liberate Singapore.

Historical figures such as the war heroes Lim Bo Seng, Elizabeth Choy and Sybil Kathigasu, the philanthropist Tan Kah Kee, as well as notorious Japanese military figures such as Ishibe Toshiro and Yoshimura Ekio, are also featured as semi-fictional characters in the drama.

Cast

Main cast 
 Rayson Tan as Lim Bo Seng (Lin Mousheng)
 Xiang Yun as Elizabeth Choy (Cai-Yang Sumei)
 Chen Shucheng as Tan Kah Kee (Chen Jiageng)
 Jacintha Abisheganaden as Sybil Kathigasu
 James Lye as Chen Dacheng (Dida Cheng)
 Lina Ng as Zhang Cuicui
 Christopher Lee as Xie Guomin
 Ivy Lee as Xiuxiu / Natsuki Hideko
 Carole Lin as Wang Qiumei
 Ryan Choo as Zhou Wenlong

Other cast 
 Chen Guohua as Zhang Ada
 Hong Huifang as Wang Jinfeng
 Brandon Wong as Fang Qinghua
 Ken Tay as Zhou Ren
 Chunyu Shanshan as Miura Kiyoe
 Guo Yikai as Ishibe Toshiro
 Wang Jinlong as Yoshimura Ekio
 Wang Kangwei as Zhuang Huiquan
 Xu Bing as Gan Choo Neo (Yan Zhuniang)
 Yang Yue as Konoe
 Li Shuyi as Ji Qiuxiang

Music
The opening theme song, which shares the same title as the series, was sung in Mandarin by Sebastian Tan (Chen Ruibiao). The main theme of the 1997 Hong Kong film The Soong Sisters and Shanghai Grand is also extensively used in the series.

Filming locations
The series was shot on location in Singapore at the now-defunct TV World in Tuas, Tan Teck Guan Building, Danish Seamen's Church, St. Andrew's School, Chung Cheng High School (Main), The Chinese High School, and HQ Tanglin Barracks (Ministry of Foreign Affairs Building), among others. Extensive filming was also done in Ipoh, Malaysia.

Accolades

See also
 In Pursuit of Peace

References

External links
 The Price of Peace official website

Singapore Chinese dramas
1997 Singaporean television series debuts
1997 Singaporean television series endings
World War II television drama series
1990s Singaporean television series
Channel 5 (Singapore) original programming
Channel 8 (Singapore) original programming